D'Juan Montrel Hart (born January 15, 1979), better known by his stage name Young Dro, is an American rapper. After gaining recognition with his regional hit song "Yes Sir", from his 2002 independent album I Got That Dro, Young Dro aligned himself with fellow Atlanta-based rapper T.I. and signed to his label, Grand Hustle, in 2004. Young Dro's debut Best Thang Smokin', was released in August 2006, under Grand Hustle and Atlantic Records. The album was preceded by his debut single "Shoulder Lean", which served as the album's lead single and proved to be a hit in the urban community and Billboard charts. After amassing an abundance of mixtapes, Young Dro released his second album High Times, 7 years later on October 15, 2013, under Grand Hustle, Atlantic and E1. It spawned the single "FDB", his highest charting single since "Shoulder Lean".

Biography

===1979–2006: Early life and Best Thang Smokin'''===
On January 15, 1979, Young Dro was born D'Juan Hart in Bankhead, a neighborhood on Atlanta's west side. His inspiration for wanting to rap came from the success of one of his best friends, Chris "Daddy Mack" Smith, one half of Kris Kross. Musically speaking however, Goodie Mob—also west Atlanta natives—had the biggest impact on him. Hart embarked on his professional career around 1999 when he signed to bass music rapper Raheem the Dream's local Atlanta label, Tight 4 Life, under the moniker Dro. He released the regional hit "Yes Sir", and an album titled I Got That Dro, around the same time T.I. released his debut, I'm Serious. Although Hart had known T.I. since the early '90s, they grew apart for some time. In 2004, Young Dro signed a recording contract with T.I.'s label imprint, Grand Hustle.http://www.rapweekly.com/?m=200607 Young Dro released his commercial debut single "Shoulder Lean", in the summer of 2006. The song had heavy rotation on BET and MTV2, and its cellular phone ringtone sold over 500,000 units. The hit single was featured on his major-label debut Best Thang Smokin', released on August 29, 2006. The album debuted at number three on the US Billboard 200 chart.

2007–2013: Mixtapes and High Times
In 2007, Dro was included in XXL's first annual Top 10 Freshmen list, featured on their cover alongside fellow American rappers Lupe Fiasco, Lil Boosie, Joell Ortiz, Plies, Saigon, Rich Boy, Gorilla Zoe, Papoose and Crooked I. On March 17, 2009, Hart released a single titled "Take Off", featuring his protege Yung L.A. The song was originally released as the first single from his then-titled second studio album P.O.L.O. (Players Only Live Once). On February 23, 2011, he released a mixtape titled Equestrian Dro. On March 17, 2011, he released a mixtape titled I Co-Sign Myself. On July 8, 2011, he released a mixtape titled Drocabulary. On January 16, 2012, he released a mixtape titled We Outchea. On July 24, 2012, he released a mixtape titled R.I.P. 2 (I Killed That Shit). On September 26, 2012, he released a mixtape titled Ralph Lauren Reefa. On March 28, 2013, the first single from his second studio album "FDB" was released. On June 17, 2013, Young Dro released the mixtape Day Two, in promotion for his second studio album. On July 10, 2013, Young Dro announced he would be releasing his second studio album, titled High Times, in October 2013. On September 18, 2013, the album cover was released and it was announced that the album would be released on October 15, 2013. On September 30, 2013, the track-listing was unveiled, revealing guest appearances on the album from Forgeeauto, Mac Boney, T.I., Spodee, Problem, Natasha Mosley, Blu June, Doe B and Miloh Smith. On September 30, 2013, the second single from High Times, titled "Strong", was released. High Times would chart at #57 on the Billboard 200 and at #9 on the Top Rap Albums chart.

2015–present: Da Reality Show
On February 27, 2015, the first single from his third studio album "We in da City" was released. On April 27, 2015, Young Dro announced he would be releasing his third studio album, titled Da Reality Show, in the summer of 2015. It was released on September 18, 2015.

On May 17, 2016, he released a joint mixtape with Zaytoven called Boot Me Up.

In August 2016, he was arrested at Georgia Southern University for possessing a gun and drugs.

As of May 2019, he is working on a project with upstart gangsta/trap rapper, Romo 11, for Just 11 Records.

DiscographyI Got That Dro (2001)Best Thang Smokin' (2006)High Times (2013)Da Reality Show'' (2015)

Awards and nominations

References

External links

Official website

1979 births
Living people
African-American male rappers
American shooting survivors
Atlantic Records artists
MNRK Music Group artists
Grand Hustle Records artists
Rappers from Atlanta
Southern hip hop musicians
Songwriters from Georgia (U.S. state)
21st-century American rappers
21st-century American male musicians
African-American songwriters
21st-century African-American musicians
20th-century African-American people
American male songwriters